The 2011 MAC men's soccer tournament was a college soccer postseason tournament for the Mid-American Conference to determine the MAC's champion and automatic berth into the 2011 NCAA Division I Men's Soccer Championship. The tournament will be held in Akron, Ohio at the University of Akron's FirstEnergy Stadium. The tournament will be held from November 11–13, 2011.

Northern Illinois won the championship. Akron would also qualify for the NCAA Tournament through an at-large bid.

Bracket

Schedule

Semifinals 

The home team/higher seed is listed on the right, the away team/lower seed is listed on the left.

MAC Championship

See also 
 Mid-American Conference Men's Soccer Tournament
 2011 Mid-American Conference men's soccer season
 2011 in American soccer
 2011 NCAA Division I Men's Soccer Championship
 2011 NCAA Division I men's soccer season

References

External links
Mid-American Conference Men's Championship

Mid-American Conference